The Paris Collection is the second album released by the pop duo Dollar. It was released in December 1980, their first album on WEA Records.

Overview
Released in late 1980, the album was the first the duo released on the WEA label. Recorded, appropriately enough, in Paris, the album failed to provide Dollar with the same success they had achieved a year previously. Out of the three single releases, only "Takin' a Chance On You" reached the charts, stalling at No.62. The album itself failed to chart. The other singles were "The Girls are Out to Get Ya" and "You Take My Breath Away". In an attempt to promote the album, members David Van Day and Thereza Bazar announced their engagement to the press, when in reality they had split up as a couple months earlier.

The tracks on the album were written by the duo themselves and largely produced by them along with Greg Walsh. Experienced hit producer Phil Wainman produced one song - "The Girls are Out to Get Ya" - which was the lead single from the album, but failed to make an impact.

Dollar went on to achieve their biggest success with the label when they teamed up with producer Trevor Horn in 1981. Tracks from this album were released as B-sides to later hit singles in a further attempt to boost sales of the album. Many of the tracks were released on compact disc on a 2006 compilation album, The Platinum Collection. The whole album was released on compact disc in February 2010 by Cherry Red Records with six bonus tracks. These included two solo singles by Van Day after the group split in 1983, "Young Americans Talking" and "Ringing the Bell", the former a No.43 hit, produced by Andy Hill.

Track listing
All tracks written by David Van Day and Thereza Bazar unless otherwise noted
Side One (The Spring Collection)
"Radio" – 3:47
"The Girls are Out to Get Ya" – 3:07
"Young Love" – 3:10
"You Take My Breath Away" – 3:33
"Love at First Sight" – 2:48

Side Two (The Autumn Collection)
"Takin' a Chance on You" – 3:39
"Ebony" – 3:09
"No Man's Land" – 2:47
"Don't Change Your Life" – 2:41
"Heartbeat (Love Me Slowly)" – 4:00

Bonus tracks (2010 re-issue)
 "The Girls Are Out to Get Ya" (Alternate 1980 Mix) – 3:31
 "Love Don’t Come Easy" (2.30
 "Young Americans Talking" (7" Version) (David Reilly / Craig Pruess) – 3:33
 "Fighting for the Country" (Nichola Martin) – 4:23
 Ringing the Bell" (Jack Hues / Nick Feldman) – 3:43
 "Young Americans Talking" (12" Version) (Reilly / Pruess) – 6:07

Personnel
David Van Day – vocals
Thereza Bazar – vocals
Billy Lyall – keyboards
Durbon Laverde – bass Guitar
Adam Blayzszyk – guitars
Stuart Elliott – drums
Joe Hammer – percussion
Greg Walsh and Dollar – production
Phil Wainman – production, track 2
Recorded at Marcus Studios and Marcon Studios, Paris
Barney Edwards – photography

Chart performance

References

1980 albums
Dollar (band) albums
Warner Music Group albums